John Wilson (27 November 1868 – 24 July 1906) was an Australian cricketer. He played one first-class match for Tasmania in 1889.

See also
 List of Tasmanian representative cricketers

References

External links
 

1868 births
1906 deaths
Australian cricketers
Tasmania cricketers
Cricketers from Tasmania
People from Westbury, Tasmania